Arcas is a figure in Greek mythology.

Arcas may also refer to:
 Arcas, an epithet of the Greek god Hermes
 Arkas, Greek comics artist
 Arcas (Macedo de Cavaleiros), a Portuguese parish
 Arcas (rocket), a sounding rocket
 Arcas (butterfly), a genus of butterflies
 Arcas (crater), a crater on Jupiter's moon Callisto